Denis Amelot  (or Amelote, or Amelotte; 1609 – 7 October 1678) was a French biblical writer and scholar who is notable for his French translation of the New Testament (4 vols. 1666-170). In his translation he quoted Greek minuscule manuscripts: 42, 43, 44, and 149  (in Gregory-Aland numbering).

Biography
Amelote was born in Saintes, in the ancient Province of Saintonge. He was ordained a priest in 1631, was a Doctor of the Sorbonne, and became a member of the French Oratory.  He was a prominent opponent of Jansenism.  He died in Paris.

See also 

 Pierre de Bérulle
 Charles de Condren

References

1609 births
1678 deaths
People from Saintes, Charente-Maritime
17th-century French Roman Catholic priests
French Oratory
17th-century French writers
17th-century French male writers
Roman Catholic biblical scholars
Translators of the Bible into French
17th-century Christian biblical scholars
17th-century French translators